Brookfield Community School is an academy school located on Chatsworth Road (A619) in the west of Chesterfield, Derbyshire. The school's most recent Ofsted inspection judged it to be 'requires improvement'.

Admissions
Brookfield Community School is a comprehensive secondary school which caters for around 1300 students between the ages 11–18 (Years 7-13), including approximately 300 sixth formers.

Academic performance
In the data for the year 2016/2017, the school had a Progress 8 score of -0.14, indicating that pupils at the end of Key Stage 4 had made less progress, on average, than pupils across England who got similar results at the end of Key Stage 2. The same data shows 57% of pupils achieving a GCSE grade 5 or above in English & Maths.

History
Brookfield Community School's history stretches back to the founding of the Chesterfield Grammar School in 1598. This school taught boys throughout the 17th and 18th century, until its closure in 1832. In 1845, the school was restarted in a new building (which remains on Sheffield Road today, and is now part of Chesterfield College), expanding to a size of around 500 in 1928. Additional land on Storrs Road (on the west side of the town) was acquired in the 1930s, but minimally used due to lack of funds and the Second World War. In 1949, work began on the levelling of playing fields on the site, which was opened in 1953.

The present site of Brookfield (on Chatsworth Road/Brookside, adjacent to the Storrs Road playing fields) was opened for Chesterfield School in 1967. Following the Education Act 1944, the school became a state-sponsored grammar school.

Brookfield Community School was formed in 1991 in a re-organisation of schools in Chesterfield, On 1 April 2011, Brookfield Community School officially gained academy status.

Notable former pupils 
 Ian Blackwell, cricketer 
 Andrew Bridge, England basketball player 
 Tom Latimer, professional wrestler known as Kenneth Cameron 
 Dene Cropper, professional football player 
 Brett Domino, musician and entertainer 
 Ryan Fletcher, musician Lawson 
 Rik Makarem, actor 
 Ellie Simpson, world para-athlete (100m World Number 2, 200m World Record Holder and GB medalist) and founder of CP Teens UK

Chesterfield Grammar School
 Chris Adams, former Derbyshire and England cricketer.
 Sir Alfred Arnold, Conservative MP from 1895-1900 for Halifax
 Tom Bailey of the Thompson Twins
 Charles Balguy, physician
 B. V. Bowden, Baron Bowden, Principal of UMIST 1953-76
 Henry Bradley, lexicographer, President from 1891-3 of the Philological Society
 Francis Chavasse, Bishop of Liverpool from 1900–23
 Erasmus Darwin, grandfather of Charles Darwin
 Robert Waring Darwin of Elston, botanist
 Sir John Fretwell, UK Ambassador to France from 1982-7
 Ken Gibbons, Archdeacon of Lancaster from 1981–97
 Richard Gillingwater CBE, Dean from 2007-2012 of the Cass Business School, Chief Executive from 2003-6 of Credit Suisse First Boston
 Rt Rev William Godfrey (bishop), Bishop of Peru since 1998
 Ralph Heathcote, writer
 Prof Sir William McCrea, astronomer
 Geoff Miller, England cricketer
 Charles Newcombe, cricketer
 Professor Ian Newton, OBE FRS FRSE, former Deputy Chief Scientific Officer, Centre for Ecology and Hydrology, Monks Wood
 Josiah Pearson, Bishop of Newcastle (Australia) from 1880–90
 Sir Robert Robinson FRSE, Nobel-prize winning organic chemist, and discoverer of the structure of morphine and penicillin, and invented the symbol for benzene in 1923
 Christopher Rowland, former Labour MP from 1964-7 for Meriden
 Sir Robin Saxby, former Chief Executive of ARM Holdings, who made it into a global giant
 Thomas Secker, Archbishop of Canterbury from 1758–68
 Captain Edwin Swale CBE DFC, WWI flying ace
 Sir Brian Unwin, President from 1993-99 of the European Investment Bank, and from 2001-13 of the European Centre for Nature Conservation, and Chairman from 1987-93 of HM Customs and Excise
 Sir David Walker (banker), Chairman since 2012 of Barclays, and Morgan Stanley International from 1995–2001, and of the Securities and Investments Board (became the Financial Services Authority) from 1988–92
 Air Marshal Philip Wigglesworth 
 Bob Wilson, goalkeeper and former BBC presenter of Football Focus
 Charles Wood, scriptwriter, who co-wrote The Charge of the Light Brigade (1968) and Tumbledown (1988).

Notable former teachers
 Cyril Bibby, biologist; taught biology (1938–40)
 Paul Holmes, History master (1979–83), Liberal Democrat MP for Chesterfield (2001–10)
 Cec Thompson, former professional rugby league footballer; Head of Economics and Rugby Master (at the school for 17 years, retired 1991)

References

External links 
 
 Brookfield in an Educational League Table
 Ofsted Report (PDF file)
 EduBase

Academies in Derbyshire
Educational institutions established in 1990
Schools in Chesterfield, Derbyshire
1990 establishments in England
Secondary schools in Derbyshire